Dustin Johner (born March 6, 1983) is a Canadian former professional ice hockey player. Johner was selected by the Florida Panthers in the 6th round (169th overall) of the 2001 NHL Entry Draft.

Playing career
Johner joined Stockholm-based Djurgårdens IF for the 2012–13 season on a one-year contract. On April 11, 2013, Johner had extended his contract with Djurgården which would see him return to play with the team for the 2013–14 season.
Djurgården was promoted to the Swedish Hockey League for the 2014–15 SHL season, and Johner's contract was not extended. He joined HockeyAllsvenskan team VIK Västerås HK in May 2014.

After five seasons in Sweden, on April 28, 2015, Johner moved to the Austrian league as a free agent, signing a one-year contract with EC VSV of the EBEL. In his second season with VSV in the 2016–17 season, Johner bettered is offensive production from the previous season with 39 points in 54 games. With Villach falling out of playoff contention, Johner was not tendered a contract to remain with the club.

On July 20, 2017, Johner penned a deal with the Belfast Giants of the UK's EIHL.

Career statistics

References

External links

1983 births
Living people
Belfast Giants players
Canadian ice hockey centres
Djurgårdens IF Hockey players
Florida Everblades players
Florida Panthers draft picks
GCK Lions players
Heilbronner EC players
HC TWK Innsbruck players
Ice hockey people from Saskatchewan
Ilves players
Las Vegas Wranglers players
Lowell Lock Monsters players
Omaha Ak-Sar-Ben Knights players
People from Estevan
Rochester Americans players
Seattle Thunderbirds players
South Carolina Stingrays players
Tingsryds AIF players
VIK Västerås HK players
Växjö Lakers players
EC VSV players
ZSC Lions players